Minarik, Minařík, or Minárik (feminine: Minaříková or Mináriková) is a surname. Notable people with this surname include:

 Anton Minárik (born 1977), Slovak judoka
 Else Holmelund Minarik (1920–2012), American author
 Henry Minarik (1927–2018), American football player
 Ján Minárik (born 1997), Slovak footballer
 Kateřina Minařík Kudějová (born 1990), Czech canoeist
 Květoslav Minařík (1908–1974), Czech author
 Marek Minařík (born 1993), Czech baseball player
 Martin Minařík (1967–2009), Czech mountaineer
 Stephen Minarik (1960–2009), American politician

See also
 

Czech-language surnames
Slovak-language surnames